Bardo is an unincorporated community and coal town in Harlan County, Kentucky, United States.

History
A post office was established at Bardo in 1929, and remained in operation until 1963. The name is derived from Bordeaux, France, according to local history.

References 

Unincorporated communities in Kentucky
Unincorporated communities in Harlan County, Kentucky
Coal towns in Kentucky